Velleda callizona is a species of beetle in the family Cerambycidae. It was described by Louis Alexandre Auguste Chevrolat in 1855. It is known from Nigeria.

References

Endemic fauna of Nigeria
Phrissomini
Beetles described in 1855